Dallas James Koehlke (born 1991), better known by his stage name DallasK, is an American DJ, record producer, writer, artist, and singer based in Los Angeles. Active since 2010, he co-wrote and produced Fifth Harmony's 5× platinum single, "Work From Home feat Ty Dolla Sign," as well as their singles "Down" and "He Like That..." off of their self titled album. In addition, Dallas co-wrote and co-produced Lauv's singles "Sad Forever," and "Breathe" off Lauv's debut album. He has past cuts with Tiesto, Chromeo, Krewella, KSHMR, Terror Jr. Miquela, Key & Stray Kids. He is also known for his collaborations with Hardwell and Tiësto: "Area 51" and "Show Me" are ranked first and third in the Top 100 on downloading platform Beatport. He is signed to Amigo Records and has had past releases with Musical Freedom, Revealed Recordings and Ultra Music.

Discography

Charting singles

Singles
 2011: Hyphy [Funkk Sound Recordings]
 2011: Crush [Burn The Fire]
 2011: Front / Back [Bazooka Records]
 2011: Jupiter [Bazooka Records]
 2012: Run [Bazooka Records]
 2013: Vice [Kindergarten Recordings]
 2013: Heaven
 2013: Alienz [Kindergarten Recordings]
 2014: Blackmail (with Henry Fong) [Ultra]
 2014: Orion [Ultra]
 2014: Burn (with KSHMR) [Revealed Recordings]
 2014: Burn (Let Your Mind Go) (with KSHMR featuring Luciana) [Spinnin' Records]
 2015: Superfuture
 2015: Area51 (with Hardwell) [Revealed Recordings]
 2015: Crash 2.0 (Adventure Club vs Dallask) [BMG Rights Management US]
 2015: Show Me (with Tiësto) [Musical Freedom]
 2015: Retrograde [Revealed Recordings]
 2015: Kaya [Revealed Recordings]
 2016: Work from Home (Fifth Harmony featuring Ty Dolla $ign) (as a songwriter and producer) [Epic and Syco Records]
 2016: Powertrip [Revealed Recordings]
 2016: Your Love (with Tiësto) [Musical Freedom]
 2017: Down (featuring Gucci Mane) [Epic and Syco Records]
 2018: All My Life [Amigo Records and If Only]
 2018: Self Control [Amigo Records and If Only]
 2018: Recover [Amigo Records and If Only]
 2018: Looking for Your Love [Amigo Records and If Only]
 2019: Sometimes (with Nicky Romero featuring XYLO) [Amigo Records and If Only]
 2019: I Know [Musical Freedom]
 2020: I Know (Club Mix) [Musical Freedom]
 2021: Try Again (featuring Lauv) [Astralwerks/Proximity]
 2022: Time (with Dark Heart) [Musical Freedom]
 2022: Loop (with Martin Garrix featuring Sasha Alex Sloan) [Astralwerks/STMPD RCRDS]
 2022: Exceso (featuring Gale) [Astralwerks/Proximity]

Remixes
 2011: Meaux Green - Poppin' Bubbly (DallasK Remix) [Funkk Sound Recordings]
 2011: Spencer & Hill - One Touch Away (DallasK Remix) [Bazooka Records]
 2012: Skrillex - Weekends (DallasK Dubstep Remix) [Big Beat]
 2013: T.I., Pharrell, Robin Thicke - Blurred Lines (DallasK Remix) [Star Trak, LLC]
 2013: Ghost Beach - Miracle (DallasK Remix) [Nettwerk]
 2013: Botnek - Through the Night (DallasK Remix) [Dim Mak Records]
 2014: Henry Fong - Stand Up (DallasK Remix) [OWSLA]
 2014: A-Trak, Andrew Wyatt - Push (DallasK Remix) [Fool's Gold Records]
 2015: Henry Fong - Stand Up (Halftime) (DallasK Remix) [OWSLA]
 2015: MGMT - Electric Feel (DallasK Remix) [Columbia (Sony)]
 2015: The Chainsmokers - Good Intentions (DallasK Remix) [Disruptor Records - Sony Music Entertainment]
 2015: Galantis - In My Head (DallasK Remix) [Big Beat Records]
 2015: Hardwell and DallasK - Area 51 (DallasK Rework) [Revealed Recs]
 2016: Tommy Trash - Luv U Giv (DallasK Remix) [Fool's Gold Records]
 2016: Martin Garrix and Bebe Rexha - "In The Name Of Love" (DallasK Remix) [STMPD RCRDS]
 2018: Tritonal featuring Lourdiz - "Love U Right" (DallasK Remix) [Enhanced Music]
 2018: Justin Caruso featuring Jake Miller - "Don't Know You" (DallasK Remix) [Big Beat Records]
2019: ITZY - "Dalla Dalla"  (DallasK Remix) [JYP Entertainment]
2019: Ashley O - "On a Roll" (DallasK Remix) [RCA Records / Null Corp II]

References

1993 births
American dance musicians
American DJs
Record producers from California
Living people
Remixers
Revealed Recordings artists